Eileen Bennett (born 8 July 1919) is a British retired film actress who was active in the late 1930s and early 1940s. She was born in London, United Kingdom. She attended the Royal Academy of Dramatic Art and started out as a model.
She made her screen debut in the 1939 film The Outsider in an uncredited role. She played Eve in the thriller Trunk Crime later that year. She was described as "Britain's new screen star" in 1942. She had significant roles in the comedy Much Too Shy (1942) and Thursday's Child (1943).

Personal life
Bennett married Thomas Hammond West, Jr. during World War II. The couple had two sons together; David Hammond and film actor Nicholas Hammond. Bennett turned 100 in July 2019.

Filmography

References

External links

1919 births
Living people
British centenarians
British film actresses
Women centenarians